Mont Blanc de Courmayeur  is a point on the south-east ridge of Mont Blanc that forms the peak of the massive south-east face of the mountain. It is connected to the main summit via the Col Major.

Despite its minimal topographic prominence, it appears as the second-highest peak in the Alps on the official list of Alpine four-thousanders of the Union Internationale des Associations d'Alpinisme (UIAA) for its impressive appearance and its importance for mountaineering.

The peak can be reached from the main summit over the Bosses ridge.

The summit of  Mont Blanc de Courmayeur is marked as lying entirely within Italy on the Italian Istituto Geografico Militare (IGM) map, while on the French Institut Géographique National (IGN) map the summit lies on the border between France and Italy. A demarcation agreement, signed on 7 March 1861, defines the local border between France and Italy. Currently this act and the attached maps (showing the border on the top of Mont Blanc, 4810 m) are legally valid for both the French and Italian governments.

Huts
 Refuge Aiguille du Goûter (3,817 m)
 Bivacco Eccles (3,850 m)
 Rifugio Monzino (2,590 m)

See also

List of Alpine four-thousanders

References

External links
 Mont Blanc de Courmayeur on SummitPost

Alpine four-thousanders
Mountains of the Alps
Mountains of France
Mountains of Italy
Mont Blanc massif